Apantesis carlotta, or Carlotta's tiger moth, is a moth of the family Erebidae. It was described by Douglas C. Ferguson in 1985. It is found in the US from Maine to Georgia, west to North Dakota and Texas.

The larvae have been reared on Lactuca species.

References

Moths described in 1985
Arctiina
Moths of North America